Ann M. Nardulli (November 28, 1948 – June 27, 2018) was an American endocrinologist known for her research into the role of estrogen in breast cancer.

Biography
Ann Wannemacher was born in 1948 in Morrison, Illinois, to Rita and Rudolph Wannemacher of Hooppole.

She received a Bachelor of Science degree in education at Northern Illinois University and taught elementary school in Addison before earning master's and doctoral degrees at the University of Illinois at Urbana–Champaign and completing postdoctoral work there in biochemistry.

Nardulli joined the university's lab run by Benita Katzenellenbogen, and eventually became a professor of the Department of Molecular and Integrative Physiology with her own lab, teaching and studying the effects of estrogen in women.

Notable research 
Nardulli's work concentrated on the specifics of estrogen activities, including the proteins it binds with, and the mechanisms that the hormone uses to manipulate chromatin and DNA. According to Katzenellenbogen,“Dr. Nardulli did pioneering work that identified the protein complexes with which the estrogen receptor associated, many previously unknown, and she and her laboratory associates went on to elucidate how these proteins collaborated with and modulated the activities of the estrogen receptor in breast cancer cells and tumors."Among the research topics explored by her team were the plasma membrane proteins and their effect on breast cancer cells as well as the proteins that these cells secrete. Later research focused on the brain and estrogen action in it.

At the university, Nardulli "was particularly fond of spending time with the Hormone Chixx, a group of women from across campus who studied the effects of hormones in the body. She discovered that introducing students to the wonders of human physiology and endocrinology was extremely rewarding and was recognized for her teaching excellence."

Advocacy 
As an active member of the Endocrine Society, she served as "chair of the Advocacy and Public Outreach Core Committee and visited Washington, D.C., numerous times to meet with legislators on Capitol Hill and lobby for increased scientific research funding." She was also a member of the society's Scientific Statements Task Force and a member of the editorial board for the academic journal Endocrine Reviews and Molecular Endocrinology.

Nardulli died at her home of cancer in 2018, aged 69.

Select publications 

 
 
 
 
 
 
 Curtis CD, Thorngren DL, Ziegler YS, Sarkeshik A, Yates JR, Nardulli AM 2009 Apurinic/apyrimidinic endonuclease 1 alters estrogen receptor activity and estrogen responsive gene expression. Mol Endocrinol 23:1346-1359.

References

External links 
Ann M. Nardulli faculty profile (archived) at University of Illinois, School of Molecular and Cellular Biology

1948 births
2018 deaths
American endocrinologists
University of Illinois Urbana-Champaign alumni
University of Illinois Urbana-Champaign faculty
Northern Illinois University alumni
People from Morrison, Illinois
Women endocrinologists
20th-century women scientists
21st-century women scientists
American scientists